Wang Kai (born April 1963) is a lieutenant general (zhongjiang) of the People's Liberation Army (PLA) serving as commander of the Tibet Military District, succeeding Wang Haijiang in March 2021.

Biography
Wang was born in Meishan County (now Meishan), Sichuan, in April 1963. During the 2008 Sichuan earthquake, Wang, the then 37th Division commander of the 13th Army, led the troops to the disaster area first. In 2009, he rose to become chief of staff of the 14th Army. In July 2013, he was made commander of the 13th Army. In April 2017, he was commissioned as deputy commander of the Western Theater Command Ground Force, he remained in that position until March 2021, when he was transferred to Tibet and given the position of commander of the Tibet Military District.

In October 2022, Wang was elected as a full member to the 20th Central Committee of the Communist Party of China.

References

1963 births
Living people
People from Meishan
People's Liberation Army generals from Sichuan